Up Country is a 2002 novel by Nelson DeMille.

Up Country may also refer to:

 Up Country, a 1972 poetry collection by Maxine Kumin
 Up Country Lions, a defunct Sri Lankan rugby union team
 Up Country Lions SC, a Sri Lankan football club

See also
 Pays d'en Haut (lit. Upper Country), a territory of New France
 Up the Country, an 1892 poem by Henry Lawson
 Up the Country (novel), a 1928 novel by Miles Franklin
 Upcountry (disambiguation)